The Metric Mile is a board game published in 1986 by Lambourne Games.

Contents
The Metric Mile is a game in which players can recreate races between some of the greatest racers.

Reception
Ellis Simpson reviewed The Metric Mile for Games International magazine, and gave it 4 stars out of 5, and stated that "Metric Mile is a gem of a game. it provides honest to goodness fun without pages of rules. The atmosphere and the flavour of the real event is beautifully captured in cardboard form."

References

External links

Board games introduced in 1986